Müpa Budapest (between 2005 and 2015 Palace of Arts – Művészetek Palotája in Hungarian) is a building in Ferencváros, Budapest, Hungary, officially opened in March 2005. It is located near Rákóczi Bridge and was designed by Zoboky, Demeter and Partners Architectural Office. The National Theatre, which opened in 2002, is located next to it.

Both Müpa Budapest and the National Theatre are part of the new Millennium City Center being created in Budapest.

The structure of Müpa Budapest covers a ground area of 10,000 m² and the total floor space of the building is 70,000 m². It received the Prix d’Excellence of FIABCI in 2006.

The general manager is Csaba Kael.

Performing arts and other facilities
 Bartók National Concert Hall is 25 m high, 25 m wide and 52 m long, providing a total capacity for 1,699 people. The concert hall features acoustics designed by Russell Johnson, who told the Wall Street Journal "in two or three years’ time, Hungarian musicians (will) say this was the best concert hall in the world" The organ of the concert hall, inaugurated on 22 May 2006, has 92 stops and 5 manuals as well as 470 wooden pipes, 5028 tin pipes and 1214 reed pipes. The extensive intonation period of the organ lasted 10 months. It is one of the largest organs in Europe. A fully playable virtual version of this pipe organ was developed for use with Hauptwerk in 2008.
 Ludwig Museum This is a state of the art Contemporary Art Museum with paintings by Picasso ("Musketeer with Sword"), David Hockney, Tom Wesselman, Richard Estes ("Rappaport Pharmacy") plus paintings by these modern Hungarian masters; Imre Bukta ("Officers at Pig Feast"), Laszlo Feher, and Imre Bak. There are also creations by Claes Oldenburg ("Lingerie Counter"), Yoko Ono, and Markus Lüpertz.
 Festival Theatre The Festival Theatre, in the Eastern third of the Palace of Arts building, seats 452 and also has the most modern technology.

See also
 Millennium City Center Budapest
 List of concert halls

References

External links

 Müpa Budapest official site
 Millennium City Pictures (PDF, requires Adobe Reader or similar)
 Organ performance at the Bartók National Concert Hall (requires Flash Player 7.0)

Art museums and galleries in Hungary
Buildings and structures in Budapest
Culture in Budapest
Buildings and structures completed in 2005
Event venues established in 2005
Art museums established in 2005
2005 establishments in Hungary
Museums in Budapest